The 2017 AFC Cup Final was the final match of the 2017 AFC Cup, the 14th edition of the AFC Cup, Asia's secondary club football tournament organized by the Asian Football Confederation (AFC).

The final was contested as a single match between Tajik team Istiklol and Iraqi team Al-Quwa Al-Jawiya. The match was hosted by Istiklol at the Hisor Central Stadium in Hisor on 4 November 2017.

Al-Quwa Al-Jawiya defeated Istiklol 1–0 and were crowned AFC Cup champions for the second consecutive year.

Teams

Venue
Hisor Central Stadium, in Hisor, Tajikistan, hosted the match. This was the second time that an AFC Cup final was played in Tajikistan, with the previous final being 2015.

Road to the final

Note: In all results below, the score of the finalist is given first (H: home; A: away).

Format
The final was played as a single match, with the host team (winner of the Inter-zone play-off final) decided by draw, which was held on 6 June 2017. If tied after regulation, extra time and, if necessary, penalty shoot-out was used to decide the winner.

Match

Details

See also
2017 AFC Champions League Final

References

External links
, the-AFC.com
AFC Cup 2017, stats.the-AFC.com

AFC Cup finals
Final
November 2017 sports events in Asia
International club association football competitions hosted by Tajikistan
FC Istiklol matches
Al-Quwa Al-Jawiya matches